James King (born 24 July 1990) is a former Welsh rugby union player. A flanker or lock forward, he played for the Ospreys regional rugby side and the Welsh national side, having previously played for Aberavon.

In January 2012 King suffered a lacerated ear injury in a collision with Xavier Rush of the Cardiff Blues and had to undergo emergency plastic surgery at Morriston Hospital, Swansea.

In January 2013 he was selected in the 35-man Wales squad for the 2013 Six Nations championship. He made his international debut against Japan on 8 June 2013 and would go on to win 11 caps for the national side, including at the 2015 Rugby World Cup.

He was forced to retire from professional rugby in January 2021 aged just 30, after failing to recover from an injury sustained whilst playing against Ulster in 2019.

References

External links 
 Ospreys profile
 Wales Profile
 ESPN Scrum Profile

Welsh rugby union players
Wales international rugby union players
Ospreys (rugby union) players
Aberavon RFC players
Living people
1990 births
Welsh people of Australian descent
Rugby union flankers
People educated at Alun School, Mold
Rugby union players from Victoria (Australia)